P. Duraipandi was an Indian politician and former Member of the Legislative Assembly of Tamil Nadu.

Early and personal life 

Duraipandi was born to a poor family, consisting of a railman, Periyampillai, and a housewife, Rakku, in a Mazhavarayanendhal village in Sivaganga district. He was educated in government school. Between caste differences in Indian society, he hailed as a successful doctor from Thanjavur Medical College, emerging as a successful politician in Manamadurai constituency. He is married to A. Manonmani, who was the chairman of Tiruppuvanam Panchayath. He has a son and a daughter, who are also doctors.

Political career 
He was elected to the Tamil Nadu legislative assembly as a Dravida Munnetra Kazhagam candidate from Manamadurai constituency in the election of 1989. He was the first to establish a bus service for his village, Mazhavarayenthal. He was the only DMK candidate to be elected in Manamadurai since 1989.

References 

Dravida Munnetra Kazhagam politicians
Living people
Year of birth missing (living people)